Facevsion, sometimes written faceVsion, was a HD WebCam manufacturer in Taiwan. It reportedly closed some or all of its offices in February 2011.

A related company, faceVsion Technology USA, is or was located in Fremont, California in the United States.

See also
 List of companies of Taiwan

References

External links
 
 faceVsion Technology USA

2009 establishments in Taiwan
2011 disestablishments in Taiwan
Computing input devices
Electronics companies established in 2009
Defunct companies of Taiwan
Electronics companies of Taiwan
Videotelephony
Webcams
Electronics companies disestablished in 2011